Ouaddaï Highlands is an area in east of Chad along the border with Sudan. The Ennedi Plateau and the Ouaddaï highlands in the east of Chad complete the image of a gradually sloping basin, which descends towards Lake Chad.

Water systems
Batha River is an important ephemeral river that carries water west from these highlands during rainy seasons, usually during flash flooding.

The land
Ouaddaï highlands mark Chad's eastern border and also divide the Chad and Nile watersheds. These highland areas are part of the East Saharan montane xeric woodlands ecoregion.

Yellow Nile
The Yellow Nile is a former tributary that connected the Ouaddaï highlands of eastern Chad to the Nile River Valley ca. 8000 to ca. 1000 BCE. Its remains are known as the Wadi Howar. The wadi passes through West Darfur near the northern border with Chad and meets up with the Nile near the southern point of the Great Bend.

Ouaddai Empire

The Ouaddai Empire (1635–1912) (Also Wadai Empire) was originally a non-Muslim kingdom, located to the east of Lake Chad in present-day Chad. It emerged in the sixteenth century as an offshoot of the Sultanate of Darfur (in present-day Sudan) to the northeast of the Kingdom of Baguirmi.

See also
Geography of Chad
Ouaddaï Region

References

Geography of Chad